Trần Hoàn, born Nguyễn Tăng Hích (1928 – 23 November 2003), was a Vietnamese songwriter and performer. Born in Hải Lăng, Quảng Trị, he composed over 150 popular and classical songs. He was a recipient of the Hồ Chí Minh Prize in 2000.

Discography
Album - Trần Hoàn Tuyệt Phẩm Bất Hủ
Album - Tình Khúc Trần Hoàn

References 

1928 births
2003 deaths
People from Quảng Trị province
Vietnamese composers
Ho Chi Minh Prize recipients
Members of the 6th Central Committee of the Communist Party of Vietnam
Members of the 7th Central Committee of the Communist Party of Vietnam